Dubrovnik Airport, also referred to as Čilipi Airport, is the international airport of Dubrovnik, Croatia. The airport is located approximately 15.5 km (9.5 mi) from Dubrovnik city centre, near Čilipi. It was the third-busiest airport in Croatia in 2019 after Zagreb Airport and Split Airport in terms of passenger throughput. It also has the country's longest runway, allowing it to accommodate heavy long-haul aircraft. The airport is a major destination for leisure flights during the European summer holiday season.

History
Yugoslav flag carrier Aeroput used a seaplane station in Dubrovnik to open the first route to the city in 1936. It linked Dubrovnik to the national capital Belgrade via Sarajevo. The following year a route to Zagreb was inaugurated. But it was in 1938 that Dubrovnik saw a significant increase in air traffic, with the introduction by Aeroput of regular flights to Vienna, Brno and Prague with stops in Sarajevo and Zagreb, and also the introduction of a regular flight between Belgrade and Tirana with a stop in Dubrovnik. The city was originally served by the Gruda Airfield which opened for commercial traffic in 1936 and was in use only during the summer months. However, by early 1940s, due to World War II, Aeroput operations were suspended.
 
The current Dubrovnik Airport opened in 1962. During 1987, the busiest year in Yugoslav aviation, the airport handled 835,818 passengers on international flights and a further 586,742 on domestic services. Following the breakup of Yugoslavia, the airport surpassed the one-million-passenger mark in 2005.

Today, Dubrovnik boasts the most modern passenger terminal in the country. A new terminal has been built in place of the old airport building, that dated from 1962, which has now been demolished to make way for a new modern structure. The price tag of the project amounts to seventy million euros and is to be financed out of a loan from the European Bank for Reconstruction and Development. In May 2010 a new terminal opened stretching over 13,700 square metres. Dubrovnik Airport has the capacity to handle two million passengers per year.

Terminal facilities

Dubrovnik Airport consists of three terminal areas, A, B and C. The spacious new Terminal C was opened in February 2017 and became fully functional in April 2017 as it replaced Terminal A for all passenger departures including check-in and security check. The new terminal features check-in and commercial space stretching over 1,000 square metres, eight security lanes, a departure lounge with commercial and catering facilities, a premium lounge and restaurants. Furthermore, it boasts sixteen gates, two of which will be used for domestic flights and the remaining fourteen for international services. With an area of 24,181 square metres, the airport's annual capacity has increased to 3.5 million passengers. The Terminal A building has been permanently closed for passenger traffic and is now being used solely as a baggage sorting facility. The new Terminal C is located next to the existing Terminal B building which handles arriving passengers. The two have been combined into a single functioning unit. Future airport plans call for an extensive commercial zone and a four-star airport hotel, and long-term plans call for a new runway and the conversion of the existing runway into a taxiway.

Airlines and destinations
The following airlines operate regular scheduled and charter flights at Dubrovnik Airport:

Statistics

Traffic figures

Largest airlines

Ground transport
A shuttle bus operated by the company Platanus connects the airport to Dubrovnik Old Town and Dubrovnik Bus Station in Gruž.

References

External links

 Official website 

Airports in Croatia
Airports established in 1962
Dubrovnik
1962 establishments in Yugoslavia
Buildings and structures in Dubrovnik-Neretva County
Transport in Dubrovnik-Neretva County